Split Level is a 1964 Australian TV play directed by Ken Hannam and written by Noel Robinson. It aired on 7 October 1964 and was shot in Sydney at ABC's Gore Hill Studios.

Australian TV drama was relatively rare at the time.

Plot
Stephanie is married to architect Mike. They live in a house on Sydney's north with their two children. Stephanie hears gossip that an old school friend of hers, Rosemary, has been having an affair, leading to the end of her marriage. Over the course of the day, Stephanie realises that the man Rosemary has been seeing is Mike.

Cast
Diana Davidson as Stephanie Stewart	
Leonard Teale as Mike Stewart
Jacki Weaver as Hilary
Elizabeth Pusey as Keith
Barbie Rogers as Rosemary
Ruth Cracknell as Alison, wife of Mike's business partner
Judi Farr as Vonnie, a friend of Stephanie's	
Winifred Green as Mrs Stewart	
Eve Wynne as Mrs Conlon
Julianna Allan as Carol	
Muriel Hopkins as Mrs Brooke	
Joan Morrow as Janet	
Max Phipps as Louis
Pat Hill
Joan Winchester
Leonard Bullen
Jonathon Constable

Production
The original title was A Day in the Sun and The Woman Who Has Everything. Jack Montgomery was the designer.

It was Noel Robinson's first original script produced for TV, although she had done a number of adaptations. Director Ken Hannam said "this is the best constructed TV play to come to me from a local author. I have no doubt Miss Robinson will become a most important writer in the next few years."

Reception
According to the Sydney Morning Herald "as an exercise in how to make a very small amount of plot fill out an hour of television drama" the play "was technically a success" but "left a good deal to be desired" being "a soap opera transposed to the upper social scale with a faintly intellectual flavour of play-readings, feature walls and flower arrangements." The critic allowed that director Hannan "extracted welcome liveliness from plenty of scene and camera angle changes, and thus at least kept the eye busy even when the mind tended to wander."

References

External links

Split Level at National Film and Sound Archive

1964 films
1960s Australian television plays
Australian television films
Films directed by Ken Hannam
1960s English-language films